The Albanian local elections in 2000 were the third local elections held in Albania. The elections were held on 1 October 2000.

References

Albania local
Local elections
2000
Albanian local elections